The Elliott-Donaldson House is a historic mansion in Okolona, Mississippi, U.S.. It was built in 1850, a decade prior to the American Civil War of 1861–1865. By the end of the war, in 1865, Confederate States Army General Nathan Bedford Forrest stayed in the house to rest. It has been listed on the National Register of Historic Places since September 15, 1980.

References

Houses on the National Register of Historic Places in Mississippi
Greek Revival houses in Mississippi
Houses completed in 1850
National Register of Historic Places in Chickasaw County, Mississippi
Antebellum architecture